The Abbot Ice Shelf is an ice shelf  long and  wide, bordering Eights Coast from Cape Waite to Pfrogner Point in Antarctica. Thurston Island lies along the northern edge of the western half of this ice shelf; other sizable islands (Sherman, Carpenter, Dustin, Johnson, McNamara, Farwell and Dendtler) lie partly or wholly within this shelf.

The ice shelf was sighted by members of the U.S. Antarctic Service in flights from the ship Bear, in February 1940, and its western portion was delineated from air photos taken by U.S. Navy (USN) Operation HIGHJUMP, 1946–47. The full extent was mapped by the U.S. Geological Survey from USN air photos of 1966. It was named by the Advisory Committee on Antarctic Names for Rear Admiral James Lloyd Abbot, Jr., Commanding Officer, U.S. Naval Support Force, Antarctica, February 1967 to June 1969.

See also
 Demas Ice Tongue
 List of glaciers
 List of Antarctic ice shelves

Ice shelves of Antarctica
Bodies of ice of Ellsworth Land